Jacob Moli (born 11 May 1967) is a Solomon Islands former footballer and the current manager of the Solomon Islands national under-17 football team. He has also been the manager of the Solomon Islands national football team, a post he held from 2011 to 2014.

References

Living people
1967 births
Solomon Islands footballers
Solomon Islands international footballers
Solomon Islands football managers
Solomon Islands national football team managers

Association footballers not categorized by position